The Delhi - Sri Ganganagar Intercity Express is an Express express train belonging to North Western Railway zone that runs between Delhi Junction and Sri Ganganagar in India.

It operates as train number 12482 from Delhi Junction to Sri Ganganagar and as train number 12481 in the reverse direction serving the states of Rajasthan, Punjab, Haryana and Delhi.

Service

Route and halts 

The important halts of the train are:

Coach composite

The train has standard ICF rakes with maximum speed of 110 km/h. The train consists of 15 coaches :

 
 
 3 AC (1 coach)
AC chair car (1 coach)
 Non ac chair
 2 General
 2 Second-class Luggage/parcel van

Traction

Both trains are hauled by a Ludhiana Loco Shed based WDM-3A (WDP-3A)diesel locomotive from Delhi to Shri Ganganagar and vice versa.

See also 

 Delhi railway station
 Shri Ganganagar Junction railway station
 Haridwar - Shri Ganganagar Intercity Express
 Delhi - Fazilka Intercity Express

Notes

External links 

 12481/Delhi - Sriganganagar InterCity Express
 12482/Sriganganagar - Delhi InterCity Express

References 

Transport in Sri Ganganagar
Transport in Delhi
Intercity Express (Indian Railways) trains
Rail transport in Haryana
Rail transport in Delhi
Rail transport in Punjab, India
Rail transport in Rajasthan